is a Japanese actor, director, artist, and businessman.

Career
Iseya co-starred with Arata Iura, Yui Natsukawa, and Susumu Terajima in Hirokazu Koreeda's Distance. He appeared in Takashi Miike's 13 Assassins.

He has also appeared in films such as Gakuryu Ishii's Dead End Run, Miike's Sukiyaki Western: Django, and Fernando Meirelles' Blindness.

He was arrested by Tokyo Metropolitan Police on September 8, 2020, on suspicion of violating the cannabis possession law.

Filmography

Film
 After Life (1998) – Yusuke Iseya
 Kinpatsu no Sogen (2000)
 Harmful Insect (2001) – Coffeeshop Guy
 Distance (2001) – Enoki Masaru
 Yomigaeri (2002) – Shunsuke
 Tsuki ni Shizumu (2002)
 Dead End Run (2003)
 Kakuto (2003)
 Casshern (2004) – Tetsuya Azuma/Casshern
 What the Snow Brings (2005) – Manabu Yazaki
 The Passenger (2005) – Kohji
 Memories of Matsuko (2006) – Youichi Ryu
 Sea Without Exit (2006)
 Tekkonkinkreet (2006) – Kimura (voice)
 Warau Michael (2006) – Kazuomi Shijo
 Honey and Clover (2006) – Shinobu Morita
 Sukiyaki Western Django (2007) – Yoshitsune
 The Insects Unlisted in the Encyclopedia (2007)
 Dog in a Sidecar (2007)
 Densen Uta (2007) – Taichi
 Closed Note (2007)
 Blindness (2008) – First Blind Man
 13 Assassins (2010) – Kiga Koyata
 The Fallen Angel (2010)
 Ashita no Joe (2011) – Tōru Rikiishi
 Kaiji 2 (2011)
 Dreams for Sale (2012)
 Land of Hope (2012) – Tanigawa
 The Tenor – Lirico Spinto (2012) – Koji Sawada
 The Kiyosu Conference (2013) – Oda Nobukane
 Ask This of Rikyu (2013) – Oda Nobunaga
 Rurouni Kenshin: Kyoto Inferno (2014) – Shinomori Aoshi
 Rurouni Kenshin: The Legend Ends (2014) – Shinomori Aoshi
 Joker Game (2015) – Yūki
 Shinjuku Swan (2015) – Mako
 Mumon: The Land of Stealth (2017) – Daizen Heki
 Shinjuku Swan II (2017) – Mako
 JoJo's Bizarre Adventure: Diamond Is Unbreakable Chapter I (2017) – Jotaro Kujo
 March Comes in Like a Lion: Part 2 (2017) – Seijirō Amaido
 Inuyashiki (2018) – Detective Hagihara
 I Love Irene (2018) – Yūjirō
 Fly Me to the Saitama (2019) – Sho Akutsu
 At the End of the Matinee (2019)
 Tonkatsu DJ Agetarō (2020) – DJ Oily
 The Devil Wears Jūnihitoe (2020) – Emperor Kiritsubo
 Rurouni Kenshin: The Final (2021) – Shinomori Aoshi
 A Morning of Farewell (2021)

Television
 Shirasu Jiro (2009) – Jirō Shirasu
 Ryōmaden (2010) – Takasugi Shinsaku
 One no Kanata ni -Chichi to Musuko no Nikkouki Tsuiraku Jikou- (2012)
 Kuruma Isu de Boku wa Sora wo Tobu (2012)
 Onna Nobunaga (2013) – Hashiba Hideyoshi
 Hana Moyu (2015) – Yoshida Shōin
 Prison's Princess (2017) – Gorō Itabashi
 Voice: 110 Emergency Control Room (2019) – Shizuku Hongo

Dubbing
 The Little Prince (2015) – the Fox

References

External links 
 
 

1976 births
Businesspeople from Tokyo
Japanese male film actors
Japanese male models
Japanese male television actors
Living people
Male actors from Tokyo
Tokyo University of the Arts alumni
Japanese expatriates in the United States
20th-century Japanese male actors
21st-century Japanese businesspeople
21st-century Japanese male actors